The unexpected cotton rat (Sigmodon inopinatus) is a species of rodent in the family Cricetidae. It is found only in Ecuador at elevations of 3500 to 4000 m, where it has been found in association with streams and marshes. It is also known as the Ecuadorian cotton rat.

References

Cotton rats
Mammals of Ecuador
Mammals described in 1924
Taxonomy articles created by Polbot